Ethnic Macedonians in Bulgaria are a group in Bulgaria concentrated within Blagoevgrad Province and the capital Sofia.  Per 2021 Bulgarian census they are 1,143 people but are not recognised as an ethnic minority.

According to the Bulgarian Helsinki Committee in 1998, their number ranged from 15,000 to 25,000. In 2006, per the personal evaluation of a leading local ethnic Macedonian activist Stojko Stojkov, they counted already between 5,000 and 10,000 people. The 1992 census indicated 10,830 Macedonians, but in the 2001 census this figure had decreased to 5,071. However in the 2011 Bulgarian census 1,654 people declared themselves to be ethnic Macedonians.

Macedonians were recognised as minority between 1946 and 1958. During this period there was a surge of Macedonistic policies, the government went as far as to declare the newly codified Macedonian an official language of the Pirin region. The Bulgarian Communist Party was compelled by Joseph Stalin to accept the formation of a distinct Macedonian nation, in order to create with the Yugoslav and Greek communists a United Macedonian state, as part of a scheduled Balkan Communist Federation. Although at the 1934 census, no Macedonians were recorded in Bulgaria, at the 1946 and 1956 censuses, the results indicated their number of almost 190,000. There are clear indications that the majority of the population from Blagoevgrad Province then was listed as ethnic Macedonians ex officio by order of the authorities.

However, differences soon emerged with regard to the Macedonian question. Whereas Bulgarians envisaged a state where Yugoslavia and Bulgaria would be placed on an equal footing, the Yugoslavs saw Bulgaria as a seventh republic in an enlarged Yugoslavia. Their differences also extended to the national character of the Macedonians – whereas Bulgaria considered them to be a national offshoot of the Bulgarians, the Yugoslavs regarded them as people who had nothing to do with the Bulgarians. Thus the initial tolerance for the Macedonization of Bulgarian Macedonia gradually grew into open shift of that policy, hence since such a nation and language did not exist before 1945, they do not exist at all.

Today the Bulgarian authorities deny any existence of Macedonian minority in the country, claiming there is no ethnic difference between both communities, while Skopje insists on the presence of such separate community, with some circles stating on 750,000 oppressed Macedonians there.

Background
Until 1913 the majority of the Slavic-speaking population of all three parts of the region of Macedonia identified as Bulgarian.  In October 1925 the Slavic population in the Bulgarian part of Macedonia repulsed a brief invasion by Greece, fighting alongside the Bulgarian army. During World War II, most parts of Yugoslav and Greek Macedonia were annexed by Bulgaria, and the local Slavic-speakers were regarded and self-identified as Macedonian Bulgarians. Not until much later did the process of Macedonian national identity formation gain momentum. After 1944, the People's Republic of Bulgaria and the Socialist Federal Republic of Yugoslavia began a policy of making Macedonia a connecting link for the establishment of new Balkan Federative Republic and stimulating there a development of distinct Slav Macedonian consciousness. The Communist Party of Greece as well as its fraternal parties in Bulgaria and Yugoslavia, had already been influenced by the Comintern and it was the only political party in Greece to recognize Macedonian national identity. The region of Vardar Macedonia received the status of a constituent republic within Yugoslavia, the Socialist Republic of Macedonia, and in 1945 a separate Macedonian language was codified. The local Slavic population was proclaimed to be ethnically Macedonian - a new nationality meant to be different from the Bulgarians or Serbs.

History

Recognition of the minority
For a period of some years after the war, the Yugoslav and Bulgarian leaders Josip Broz Tito and Georgi Dimitrov worked on a project to merge their two countries into a Balkan Federative Republic according to the projects of Balkan Communist Federation. As a concession to the Yugoslavian side, Bulgarian authorities agreed to the recognition of a distinct Macedonian ethnicity and language as part of their own population in the Bulgarian part of geographical Macedonia. This was one of the conditions of the Bled agreement, signed between Yugoslavia and Bulgaria on 1 August 1947. In November 1947, pressured by the Yugoslavs, Bulgaria also signed a treaty of friendship with Yugoslavia, and teachers were sent from the Socialist Republic of Macedonia to Blagoevgrad Province to teach the newly codified Macedonian language. The Bulgarian president Georgi Dimitrov was sympathetic to the Macedonian Question. The Bulgarian communist government was compelled  once again to adapt its stand to Soviet interests in the Balkans. At the same time, the organisation of the old nationalist movement the Internal Macedonian Revolutionary Organization (IMRO) in Bulgaria was suppressed by the Bulgarian communist authorities.

Reversal of recognition
However, differences soon emerged with regard to the Macedonian question. Whereas Dimitrov envisaged a state where Yugoslavia and Bulgaria would be placed on an equal footing and Macedonia would be more or less attached to Bulgaria, Tito saw Bulgaria as a seventh republic in an enlarged Yugoslavia tightly ruled from Belgrade. Their differences also extended to the national character of the Macedonians – whereas Dimitrov considered them to be an national offshoot of the Bulgarians, Tito regarded them as an independent nation which had nothing to do with the Bulgarians. Thus the initial tolerance for the Macedonization of Bulgarian Macedonia gradually grew into outright alarm. As result gradual change of that policy came in Bulgaria after the Tito–Stalin split in 1948. 

Macedonians in Bulgaria wishing to join Yugoslavia reportedly conducted guerilla warfare in 1951. About 400 Macedonian prisoners were being held in the Belene labour camp in 1951. Modern sources maintain that resistors to the anti-Macedonian policy formed organizations and were sent to Belene. However, another modern sources clarify, such people were in fact not ethnic Macedonians who wish to join Yugoslavia, but IMRO right-wing activists, supporters of the idea about an Independent Macedonia. Some of them formed anti-communist detachments, while others were arrested by the communist authorities and interned in labour camps. At that time in the Pirin region didn't crystallize such significant collective identity, which may be qualified as a Macedonian minority.

A change of policy came in 1958. At the plenum of the Bulgarian Communist Party held the same year, the decision was made that the Macedonian nation and language did not exist. Afterwards, the teaching of the Macedonian language was discontinued and the Macedonian teachers from Yugoslavia were expelled. Since 1958, Bulgaria has not recognized a Macedonian minority in the Pirin region and in the following ten years, the 178,862 strong Macedonian population fell to just 1,600. The March Plenum of the Central Committee of the BCP openly denounces any notion of "a separate Macedonian nation" in Bulgaria. However, in 1964 four people were tried for writing: "We are Macedonians" and "Long live the Macedonian nation" on a restaurant wall.

After fall of communism 
Since the fall of communism in the early 1990s various associations have been set up to represent the minority, these include the association United Macedonian Organisation (UMO-Ilinden), the political party United Macedonian Organisation: Ilinden–Pirin (UMO Ilinden-Pirin) and the Internal Macedonian Revolutionary Organisation - Independent (IMRO-I) . These organizations have called for the restoration of rights granted to Macedonians during the 1940s and 1950s. However, such organizations in Pirin were restrained by Bulgarian authorities in the 1990s. Police also prevented ethnic Macedonians from commemorating Jane Sandanski at his gravesite. The Republic of Bulgaria has not recognized the Macedonian language. However, in 1999 the linguistic controversy between the two countries was solved with the help of the phrase: "the official language of the country in accordance with its constitution". 

Meanwhile, in 1999, Ivan Kostov and Lyubcho Georgievski, the prime ministers of Bulgaria and Macedonia respectively, signed a common declaration, which proclaimed that no Macedonian minority exists within Bulgaria.

In 2006, according to a personal evaluation of a leading local ethnic Macedonian political activist Stoyko Stoykov, the present number of Bulgarian citizens with ethnic Macedonian self-consciousness is between 5,000 and 10,000. He has claimed that the result of the 2011 census, which counted only 1,654 Macedonians is a consequence of manipulation. Stoykov has explained that from this figure, even about 1,000 people were registered as Macedonia citizens. According to the Bulgarian Helsinki Committee, the vast majority of the population in Pirin Macedonia has a Bulgarian national self-consciousness and a regional Macedonian identity similar to the Macedonian regional identity in Greek Macedonia. Moreover, the majority of Bulgarians believe that most of the population of North Macedonia is Bulgarian. In 2019, Bulgaria adopted a framework position on the EU accession of North Macedonia, in which it demanded that North Macedonia refrain from supporting the Macedonian minority in the country in any way and re-affirmed its non-recognition of the minority.

Census results

Government intervention 
From 20 to 31 December 1946, the People's Republic of Bulgaria conducted a census during which, on December 27 the governor of Blagoevgrad districts sent a telegram with an order all Bulgarians (excluding the ones migrated from other regions of Bulgaria) in the region to be counted as ethnic Macedonians, including the Bulgarian Muslims. According to the census results 169,544  people of Bulgaria declared themselves to be ethnic Macedonians. Of the total 252,908 inhabitants of Blagoevgrad Province 160,541 or roughly 64% of the population declared themselves to be ethnic Macedonians.

The forcible change of the ethnicity of the population was confirmed by the leader of the opposition party BZNS "Nikola Petkov" who on 30 December 1946 stated that "the population is disgusted by this outrageous violation of conscience."

There are strong indications that the majority of the population from Blagoevgrad Province was listed as ethnic Macedonians against their will in the 1946 and 1956 census.

In 1956, 187,789 people of Bulgaria declared themselves to be ethnic Macedonians. Of the 281,015 inhabitants of Blagoevgrad Province, 178,862 people declared themselves to be Macedonians; a rate which stayed the same at roughly 64% of the population. Other areas of Macedonian declaration consisted of: 4046 from Sofia, 1955 from Plovdiv and the remaining 2926 were scattered throughout Bulgaria.

The change in the population came in 1965 census, when the people in the province declared free as Bulgarians, within ten years the 187,789 strong Macedonian minority fell to just 9,632 individuals. The 1965 census counted only 9,632 people declaring themselves to be Macedonians. While the number of Macedonians from other parts of Bulgaria did not change compared to previous censuses (c. 8-9,000), the number of Macedonians in the district of Blagoevgrad fell to 1,432 in the 1965 census. The Communist Party of Bulgaria insisted at the time that the process had been completed in a completely "free" manner, but 20 years later Zhivkov mentioned a "manoeuvre" he had employed, known only to four persons, to turn the all the population of the region of Pirin into Bulgarians "within a few days".

Government intervention withdrawn
In the 1992 census, 10,803 people declared themselves to be Macedonian. Of them, 3,500 registered Macedonian as their mother tongue. According to the President of the Bulgarian Helsinki Committee Krasimir Kanev, the real number of Macedonians in Bulgaria varies from 15,000 to 25,000.

Results of the 2001 census in the Blagoevgrad region of Bulgaria.

As regards self-identification, a total of 1,654 people officially declared themselves to be ethnic Macedonians in the latest Bulgarian census in 2011 (0,02%) and 561 of them are in Blagoevgrad Province (0,2%). There are 1,091 citizens of North Macedonia who are permanent residents in Bulgaria.

Political representation
The UMO Ilinden-Pirin party claims to represent the ethnic Macedonian minority in Bulgaria. In 2007 it was accepted as member of the European Free Alliance. On 29 February 2000, by decision of the Bulgarian Constitutional Court, UMO Ilinden–Pirin was banned, as a separatist party, which is banned by the Bulgarian constitution, which also forbids parties on ethnic and religious grounds. On 25 November, the European Court of Human Rights in Strasbourg condemned Bulgaria because of violations of the UMO Ilinden–Pirin's freedom of organizing meetings. The court stated that Bulgaria had violated Act 11 from the European Convention of Human Rights. UMO-Ilinden has been accused of being funded by the Skopie government, which was confirmed by members of the party itself.

Many other Macedonian organizations have been set up since the fall of communism they include; Independent Macedonian Association – Ilinden, Traditional Macedonian Organization — TMO, Union for the Prosperity of Pirin Macedonia, Committee on the Repression of Macedonians in the Pirin part of Macedonia, Solidarity and Struggle Committee of Pirin Macedonia, the Macedonian Democratic Party and the People's Academy of Pirin Macedonia.

On October 30 2022, a Macedonian culture club named after Nikola Vaptsarov was opened. Prior to the opening of the club, on October 18 2022, the Council of the Blagoevgrad Municipality adopted a declaration which banned the opening of the club. During the opening a verbal incident occured, and delegations were blocked laying wreaths on the Gotse Delchev monument in Blagoevgrad by members of VMRO-BND.

On 4 February 2023, the glass façade of the club was smashed by unknown individuals with stones on 4 February 2023. Multiple people were arrested. The incident was condemned by North Macedonia's president, Stevo Pendarovski, and by the European Free Alliance.

Macedonian-language media
In 1947 the newspaper 'Pirinski Vestnik' (Pirin Newspaper) was established and a "Macedonian Book" publishing company were set up. These were part of the measures to promote the Macedonian language and consciousness and were subsequently shut down in 1958. In the early 1990s a new newspaper was established for the ethnic Macedonian minority in Blagoevgrad Province, it is called Narodna Volja and its main office is in Blagoevgrad. The ideology of the newspaper is similar to official state policies and historiography in North Macedonia. Among its main topics are the history and culture of Macedonia and the Macedonians in Bulgaria.

European Court of Human Rights Decisions and European Parliament 
Macedonians have been refused the right to register political parties (see United Macedonian Organization Ilinden and OMO Ilinden - PIRIN) on the grounds that the party was an "ethnic separatist organization funded by a foreign government", something that is against the Bulgarian constitution. The constitutional court has not however banned the Evroroma (Евророма) and MRF(ДПС) parties, who are widely considered as ethnic parties. The European Court of Human Rights held "unanimously, that there had been a violation of Article 11 (freedom of assembly and association) of the European Convention on Human Rights."

In November 2006, the members of the European Parliament Milan Horáček, Joost Lagendijk, Angelika Beer and Elly de Groen-Kouwenhoven introduced an amendment to the accession of Bulgaria to the European Union protocol calling "on the Bulgarian authorities to prevent any further obstruction to the registration of the political party of the ethnic Macedonians (OMO-Ilinden PIRIN) and to put an end to all forms of discrimination and harassment vis-à-vis that minority."

On May 28, 2018, the European Court of Human Rights made two decisive rulings against Bulgaria in violation of Article 11 (freedom of assembly and association) of the Convention for the Protection of Human Rights and Fundamental Freedoms. In the two rulings: Case of Vasilev and Society of the Repressed Macedonians in Bulgaria Victims of the Communist Terror v. Bulgaria (Application no. 23702/15); and Case of Macedonian Club for Ethnic Tolerance in Bulgaria and Radonov v. Bulgaria (Application no. 67197/13), the European Court of Human Rights unanimously ruled that Bulgaria violated Article 11 (freedom of assembly and association) of the Convention for the Protection of Human Rights and Fundamental Freedoms, and that Bulgaria must pay a collective total of 16,000 euros to the applicants.

Notable individuals
Dimitar Blagoev (1856–1924), political leader and philosopher
Krsto Enčev, co-founder of Narodna Volja ("People's Will") newspaper
Georgi Hristov, poet
Vasil Ivanovski (1906–1991), journalist
Ivan Katardžiev (1926–2018), historian and politician
Jordan Kostadinov, ethnic Macedonian rights activist, co-founder of OMO Ilinden Party
Slave Makedonski, poet and writer
Venko Markovski (1915–1988), writer, poet, and partisan
Krste Misirkov (1874–1926), philologist, writer, historian, and ethnographer
Katerina Nurdzhieva (1922–2018), ethnic Macedonian activist
Georgi Radulov, professor
Boris Sarafov (1872–1907), IMRO revolutionary
Mihail Smatrakalev, poet and activist
Georgi Solunski, actor
Stojko Stojkov (historian), historian and journalist
Stefan Vlahov Micov, political activist

See also
Macedonian Bulgarians
Bulgarians in North Macedonia
Macedonian Question

References

Bibliography

Notes

External links
OMO Ilinden-Pirin - The site of the banned ethnic Macedonian party in Bulgaria.
Center for Documentation and Information on Minorities in Europe-Southeast Europe  - Comprehensive study done by the Greek Helsinki Monitor on the Macedonians in Bulgaria.
Narodna Volja - Macedonian Newspaper for Theory, History, Culture and the Arts.
Bulgarian Subject Files - Social Issues: Minorities: Macedonians, Blinken Open Society Archives, Budapest

Macedonians
Bulgaria
Blagoevgrad Province
Bulgaria–North Macedonia relations